The Jaipur–Ahmedabad line connects Jaipur, the capital of Rajasthan to Ahmedabad, the largest city of Gujarat in India. It is present on Ahmedabad–Delhi main line. Swarna Jayanti Rajdhani Express is the fastest train in this route.

History
Rajputana State Railway opened the Delhi–Bandikui -wide metre-gauge line in 1874, extended it to Ajmer in 1875 and to Ahmedabad in 1881.

The Delhi–Ajmer metre-gauge line was converted to  broad gauge in 1994. The Ahmedabad–Ajmer sector was fully converted to broad gauge in 1997.

Railway electrification work is now completed in Rewari–Alwar–Bandikui–Jaipur–Palanpur–Ahmedabad sector.

Passenger movement
,  and Ajmer on this line, are amongst the top hundred booking stations of Indian Railways.

Sheds and workshops
Sabarmati earlier had a steam loco shed, now it has diesel loco shop. It holds 125+ WDG-4 locomotives. Ajmer has a diesel loco workshop and a carriage and wagon workshop. Opened in 1876, it is one of Indian Railway's premier workshops. It maintains Palace on Wheels rake. Abu Road has a diesel loco shed. Phulera has a diesel shed.

References

External links
Trains at Jaipur
Trains at Abu Road
Trains at Ahmedabad

5 ft 6 in gauge railways in India
Rail transport in Rajasthan
Railway lines in Gujarat

Railway lines opened in 1881
1881 establishments in India
Transport in Ahmedabad
Transport in Jaipur